The 1935–36 FAW Welsh Cup is the 55th season of the annual knockout tournament for competitive football teams in Wales.

Key
League name pointed after clubs name.
B&DL - Birmingham & District League
CCL - Cheshire County League
FL D2 - Football League Second Division
FL D3N - Football League Third Division North
FL D3S - Football League Third Division South
MWL - Mid-Wales Football League
SFL - Southern Football League
WLN - Welsh League North
WLS D1 - Welsh League South Division One
WLS D2 - Welsh League South Division Two
W&DL - Wrexham & District Amateur League

First round

Second round
17 winners from the First round plus three new clubs.

Third round
Ten winners from the Second round plus 18 new teams.

Fourth round

Fifth round
Four winners from the Fourth round. Lovell's Athletic, Rhyl and Bangor City get a bye to the Sixth round.

Sixth round
Two winners from the Fifth round, Lovell's Athletic, Rhyl and Bangor City plus eleven new clubs.

Seventh round

Semifinal
First match between Shrewsbury Town and Crewe Alexandra were held in Bangor, replay at Rhyl.

Final
Final were held in Wrexham.

External links
The FAW Welsh Cup

1935-36
Wales
Cup